Johan Wästlund (born 26 February 1971) is a Swedish mathematician currently at Chalmers University of Technology and, in 2013, was awarded Royal Swedish Academy of Sciences's Göran Gustafsson Prize.

References

Living people
Academic staff of the Chalmers University of Technology
Swedish mathematicians
1971 births